Muhammad Sa'id al-Sakkar (Arabic: محمد سعيد الصكار) (French: Mohammed Saïd Saggar) was an Iraqi poet and calligrapher. He was born in Miqdadiyah in the Diyala Governorate in 1934. He used to be a painter; he ran a publishing house in Paris since 1978, and has been a journalist since 1955. He published his literature and critical articles in many newspapers and magazines. He has published over 14 books of poetry, theatre, the short story, linguistics, art, and other disciplines. He is arguably the most distinguished Iraqi artist-calligrapher in the 21st century. al-Sakkar died in Paris on March 23, 2014.

Life 
al-Sakkar was born in 1934 in Miqdadiyah, east of Baghdad, but grew up in Basra, a governate in southern Iraq. Basra remained visible in al-Sakkar's works, starting with his first poetry collection Rain (1962) and An Orange in the Surah of Water (1968), as well as his many paintings, which made him a prominent present-day calligrapher and artisan. The Iraqi artist has resided in France since 1978; he chose it when he was forced into exile and had more time to work on his art works in his studio. In his long professional career, al-Sakkar practiced journalism as an editor, calligrapher, and designer since 1955.

Works 
His collections of poetry include:

 Rain; 1962
 An Orange in the Surah of Water; 1968
 The Complete Works of Poetry
 A Collection in French; 1995

His publications include:

 Arabic Calligraphy for Youth
 The Days of Abd al-Haqq al-Baghdadi
 The Pen and What Has Been Written
 The Plight of Mahmoud al-Shahid

Awards 
al-Sakkar has received several awards, most notably the Architectural Heritage Award, which he received in recognition of his design of the Mecca Gate. The Arab World Institute honored al-Sakkar on the 17th of March. "[al-Sakkar was] one of the most outstanding representatives of modern Arabic calligraphy," said Jack Lang, President of the Arab World Institute and former French Minister of Culture.

al-Sakkar created the "Focused Arabic Alphabet" 40 years ago in an attempt to simplify Arabic script for the developments of digital printing systems. Thanks to this innovation, the first informatics applications were launched, enabling computer designers to design various Arabic texts currently in use.

References 

1934 births
2014 deaths
20th-century calligraphers
20th-century Iraqi poets
21st-century calligraphers 
21st-century Iraqi poets
Calligraphers of Arabic script
Iraqi calligraphers 
Iraqi contemporary artists
Iraqi emigrants to France
Iraqi fiction writers
Iraqi journalists
Iraqi male short story writers
Iraqi Muslims
Iraqi people
Iraqi short story writers
Iraqi writers